Education in Australia encompasses the sectors of early childhood education (preschool) and primary education (primary schools), followed by secondary education (high schools), and finally tertiary education, which includes higher education (universities and other higher education providers) and vocational education (Registered Training Organisations). Regulation and funding of education is primarily the responsibility of the States and territories; however, the Australian Government also plays a funding role.

Education in Australia is compulsory between the ages of four, five, or six and fifteen, sixteen or seventeen, depending on the state or territory and the date of birth.

For primary and secondary education, government schools educate approximately 60 per cent of Australian students, with approximately 40 per cent in non-government schools. At the tertiary level, the majority of Australia's universities are public, and student fees are subsidised through a student loan program where payment becomes due when debtors reach a certain income level.

Underpinned by the Australian Qualifications Framework, implemented in 1995, Australia has adopted a national system of qualifications, encompassing higher education, vocational education and training (VET), and school-based education. For primary and secondary schools, a national Australian Curriculum has been progressively developed and implemented since 2010.

Australia is a leading global provider of education to international students, and in 2012 was ranked as the third-largest provider of international education after the United States and the United Kingdom. Australia has the highest ratio of international students per head of population in the world by a large margin, with 812,000 international students enrolled in the nation's universities and vocational institutions in 2019.

The Education Index, published with the UN's Human Development Index in 2018, based on data from 2017, listed Australia as 0.929, the second-highest in the world.

In 1966 the Australian Government signed the Convention against Discrimination in Education, which aimed to combat discrimination and racial segregation in the field of education.

Regulation and funding 
The regulation, operation, and funding of education is the responsibility of the States and territories, because the Australian Government does not have a specific constitutional power to pass laws with concerning education. However, the Federal government helps to fund non-government schools, helps to fund public universities and subsidises tertiary education through a national student loan scheme, and regulates vocational education providers.

Post-compulsory education is regulated within the Australian Qualifications Framework, a unified system of national qualifications in schools, vocational education and training, and the tertiary education sector.

The Australian Government's involvement in education has been the responsibility of several departments over the years, with the Department of Education, Skills and Employment being formed in 2020.

The academic year in Australia varies between States and institutions; however, it generally runs from late January/early February until early/mid-December for primary and secondary schools, with slight variations in the inter-term holidays and TAFE colleges, and from late February until mid-November for universities with seasonal holidays and breaks for each educational institute.

Preschool
Historically, preschool and pre-prep programmes in Australia were relatively unregulated and not compulsory.  While still not mandatory for children to attend, the Federal Government has had a focus since 2009 on encouraging families to enrol their children (from around 4 years of age) in a preschool or kindergarten that delivers quality early childhood education and care Federal and state legislation now requires preschool services to implement and deliver programming based on the nationally approved Early Years Learning Framework  The first exposure many Australian children have to learn with others outside of traditional parenting is daycare or a parent-run playgroup. This sort of activity is not generally considered schooling, as preschool education is separate from primary school in all states and territories, except Western Australia where pre-school education is taught as part of the primary school system and Victoria where the state framework, the Victorian Early Years Learning and Development Framework (VEYLDF) covers children from birth to 8 years old, is used by some schools over the national framework. In Queensland, preschool programmes are often called Kindergarten or Pre-Prep and are usually privately run but attract state government funding if run for at least 600 hours a year and delivered by a registered teacher.

Preschools are usually run by the state and territory governments, except in Victoria, South Australia and New South Wales where they are more often run by local councils, community groups or private organisations. Preschool is offered to three- to five-year-olds; attendance numbers vary widely between the states, but 85.7% of children attended preschool the year before school. The year before a child is due to attend primary school is the main year for preschool education. This year is far more commonly attended and may take the form of a few hours of activity during weekdays.  Most states of Australia now fund government preschools to offer 15 hours per week (600 hours over a year) for each enrolled child in the year before they commence formal schooling

Primary and secondary education 

10,584 registered schools were operating in Australia in 2019, of which 7,092 were government schools. As of 2019, government schools educated 65.4% of all students. In 2017, there were just under 282,000 teachers in Australian primary and secondary schools. Of the non-government schools, nearly two-thirds were Catholic schools. The major part of government-run schools' costs is met by the relevant state or territory government.  The Australian Government provides the majority of public funding for non-government schools, which is supplemented by states and territories.

Non-government schools, both religious or secular typically charge compulsory tuition and other fees. Government schools provide education without compulsory tuition fees, although many government schools ask for payment of 'voluntary' fees to defray particular expenses.

Regardless of whether a school is government or non-government, it is regulated by the same curriculum standards framework. The framework is administered by the Australian Curriculum, Assessment and Reporting Authority. Most schools require students to wear prescribed school uniforms. A school year in Australia starts in January and finishes in December.

History of school education in Australia 

The first formal education in Australia began when the European convicts and settlers began to build the first public infrastructure, in the 19th century. The first schools were either built by ex-convicts or members of the Church. The oldest school in continuous operation in Australia is Newcastle East Public School, founded in 1816. Beginning in approximately 1905, many children of the Stolen Generations were educated like white children, with the aim of effectively assimilating them into the white community. This was made illegal in 1969.

Compulsory attendance requirements 
School education in Australia is compulsory between certain ages as specified by state or territory legislation. Depending on the state or territory, and date of birth of the child, school is compulsory from the age of five to six to the age of fifteen to seventeen.

In the ACT, NSW, the Northern Territory, Queensland, South Australia, Victoria, and Western Australia, children are legally required to attend school from the age of six years old, until the minimum leaving age. In Tasmania, the compulsory school starting age is 5 years old. However, most children commence the preliminary year of formal schooling, in Pre-Year 1, between four and a half and five and a half years of age, variously called kindergarten (sometimes called Year K), reception, preparation (also abbreviated as "prep") and transition.

, the national apparent retention rate (ARR), a measure of student engagement that provides an indicator of the success of education systems in keeping students in school beyond the minimum leaving age, was 78 per cent for all full-time students in Year 12.

Australian Curriculum 

While state and territory governments are responsible for the regulation and delivery of school-based education within their jurisdiction, through the Council of Australian Governments, the Commonwealth Government has, since 2014, played an increasing role in the establishment of the Australian Curriculum that sets the expectations for what all young Australians should be taught, regardless of where they live in Australia or their background. The development of the Australian Curriculum is based on the principles of improving the quality, equity and transparency of Australia's education system. The Australian Curriculum, for pre-Year 1 to Year 10, is made up of the following eight learning areas: English; Mathematics; Science; Humanities and Social Sciences; The Arts; Technologies; Health and Physical Education as well as Languages. In the senior secondary Australian Curriculum, for Year 11 and Year 12, fifteen senior secondary subjects across English, Mathematics, Science, History and Geography were endorsed between 2012 and 2013. The Australian Curriculum, Assessment and Reporting Authority has mandated the achievement standards that describe the quality of learning (including the depth of understanding, the extent of knowledge, and the sophistication of skill) expected of students who have studied the content for each subject.

Types of schools 
The types of schools in Australia fall broadly into two categories: government schools, being those schools operated by state or territory departments or agencies; and non-government schools, being those schools that are not operated by government departments or agencies. Non-government schools can be further classified, based on self-identification of the school's affiliation. Non-government schools are grouped for reporting as Catholic schools (including Catholic-affiliated independent schools) or independent (other non-government schools).

Government schools receive funding from the relevant state or territory government. Non-government schools receive funding from the Australian Government and relevant state or territory government; and in most cases, parents are required to make a co-payment for their child's education.

 across primary and secondary education, approximately two-thirds of all school students attended government schools; with the remaining one-third of students educated in non-government schools.

A small portion of students are legally home-schooled, particularly in rural areas.

School years

Primary schools 

Also sometimes called infants schools, Australia adopts the UNESCO term of primary school that generally covers a child's education from pre-Year 1) and finish with Year 6. The duration of primary school years varies across each Australian state and territory, with most adopting seven years; except in South Australia, where, until 2022, students finish with Year 7, making the duration of primary school eight years; until they are 11, 12 or 13 years of age. Primary schools focus on developing essential literacy, numeracy and social skills, and provide foundational knowledge to children about the world around them.

Secondary schools 

Secondary schools in Australia are also called high schools and colleges (or junior, intermediate, or senior colleges). Secondary schools vary across each Australian state and territory, but they generally cover Year 7 to Year 10 (compulsory period of education) and senior secondary schools continue to Year 12.

Middle schools 

In the majority of Australian states and territories, middle schools are relatively uncommon. Students progress from primary school to secondary school. As an alternative to the middle school model, some secondary schools divided their grades into "junior high school" (Years 7, 8, 9 and 10) and "senior high school" (Years 11 and 12). Some have three levels, "junior" (Years 7 and 8), "intermediate" (Years 9 and 10), and "senior" (Years 11 and 12).

In June 2006 the Northern Territory Government introduced a three-tier system featuring middle schools for Year 7 to Year 9 (approximate age 12–15) and high school for Year 10 to Year 12 (approximate age 15–18).

Combined and central schools 

In Australia, combined schools are schools that have classes from both primary and secondary year levels. These schools may be located in an urban, regional or rural area and can be government or non-government schools.  there were approximately 500 Australian combined government schools and approximately 850 Australian combined non-government schools.

Central schools are predominantly, but not exclusively, government schools located in a rural area that provides both primary and lower secondary education to students, usually concluding at Year 10.  there were 62 Australian central schools, and all except one were located in rural New South Wales. In Western Australia, the term district high school is synonymous with central school.

Organisational structures 
Schools are broadly categorised into government and non-government schools. The non-government schools are further categorised into Catholic schools and independent schools. , 65.7% of students were enrolled in government schools, 19.7% in catholic schools and 14.6% in independent schools.

Government schools 

Also called state schools or public schools, government schools educate approximately two-thirds of all school students in Australia. If a student elects to attend a government school, they are required to attend a school within their local school district unless the student has dispensation to attend another school, usually approved based on academic merit, specialisation, or other reasons, such as a student disability.

Government schools are run by the respective state government agency. They offer free education; however, many government schools ask parents to pay a contribution fee and a materials and services charge for stationery, textbooks, sports, uniforms, school camps and other schooling costs that are not covered under government funding. In 2010 the additional cost for schooling was estimated to be on average $316 per year per child.

Government schools may be further categorised into open or comprehensive schools, selective, special, and specialist schools; all defined below. In 2009 the Western Australia government introduced Independent Public Schools to describe a government school that, while a part of the state education system, was granted a higher degree of decision-making authority than a regular government school. A similar reform was introduced in Queensland and, as of December 2018, 250 government schools commenced as independent public schools in Queensland. In February 2014 the then Federal Education Minister, Christopher Pyne, announced a $70 million Independent Public Schools Initiative to support 1,500 Australian government schools to become more autonomous.

Government hospital schools are located at some major hospitals and provide access to tuition for students who have extended stays in hospitals.

Across Australia, the Federal Department of Education sets the overall national policy and direction for education in Australia. The following state and territory government departments are responsible for the administration of education within their respective jurisdictions:

Non-government schools 
Schools from the non-government sector operate under the authority of state or territory governments but are not operated by government education departments. Schools from the non-government sector may operate as individual schools, in small groups or as a system such as those coordinated by the Catholic Education Commission in each state and territory.  All non-government schools in Australia receive funding from the Commonwealth government.

Catholic schools 

The education system delivered by the Roman Catholic Church in Australia has grown from 18th-century foundations to be the second-biggest provider of school-based education in Australia. , one in five Australian students attended Catholic schools. There are over 1,700 Catholic schools in Australia with more than 750,000 students enrolled, employing almost 60,000 teachers.

Administrative oversight of Catholic education providers varies depending on the origins, ethos, and purpose of each education provider. Oversight of Catholic systemic schools may rest with a Catholic parish, diocese, or archdiocese; while religious institutes have oversight of Catholic independent schools.

The National Catholic Education Commission (NCEC), established by the Australian Catholic Bishops Conference through the Bishops Commission for Catholic Education, is tasked with maintaining liaison with the federal government and other key national education bodies and complements and supports the work of the state and territory Catholic education commissions. While some Catholic schools operate independently via religious institutes, the majority of Catholic schools, called systemic schools, operate under the Canon Law jurisdiction of an ecclesiastical public juridic person, such as a bishop. In practice, the bishop assigns a Catholic Education Office (CEO), Catholic Education Commission, Catholic Schools Offices, or a similar body with daily operational responsibility for the leadership, efficient operation, and management of the Catholic systemic schools which educate in parish primary and regional secondary schools in Australia. These diocesan bodies are charged with the implementation and management of the policies of the diocese and the allocation and administration of the funds provided by the government and private sources to Catholic systemic schools, as well as the financial responsibilities for the administration of salaries for staff members.

Most Catholic schools (96 per cent) are systemically funded, meaning that the government funding they nominally attract is provided to the relevant state Catholic Education Commission for needs-based distribution. Sixty-one Australian Catholic schools are non-systemically funded (independent schools) and receive government grants directly.

Independent schools 

Independent schools are a sub-set of non-government schools that are not operated by government authority and have a system of governance that ensures their independent operation. Such schools are typically operated by an independently elected school council or board of governors and range broadly in the type of school education provided and the socio-economics of the school community served. Some independent schools are run by religious institutes; others have no religious affiliation and are driven by a national philosophy (such as international schools), pedagogical philosophy (such as Waldorf-Steiner schools), or specific needs (such as special schools). , including independent schools run by Catholic religious institutes, of the 9,477 schools in Australia 1,140 schools (12 per cent) are in the independent sector. In the same year, independent schools enrolled over 617,000 students or 16 per cent of the Australian student population.

Independent school fees can vary from under $100 per month to $3,200, depending on the student's year level, the school's size, and the socioeconomics of the school community. In late 2018 it was reported that the most expensive independent schools (such as the APS Schools, the AGSV Schools in Melbourne, the GPS Schools, QGSSSA Schools in Brisbane and the NSW GPS Schools, Combined Associated Schools and the ISA Schools in Sydney and New South Wales) charge fees of up to $500,000 for the thirteen years of independent school education.

Australian independent schools broadly fall into the following categories:

Specialist organisational structures

Special schools 

A special school is a school catering for students who have special educational needs due to learning difficulties, physical disabilities, developmental disabilities or social/emotional disturbance, or who are in custody, on remand or in hospital. Special schools may be specifically designed, staffed and resourced to provide appropriate special education for children with additional needs. Students attending special schools generally do not attend any classes in mainstream schools. The schools cater for students with mild, moderate and profound intellectual disabilities, deaf and hard of hearing students, students with Autism and students with a physical disability. Class sizes at specialist schools are smaller than at mainstream schools, and there is a much lower ratio of teaching and support staff to students. Some specialist schools also have therapists on staff. Specialist schools generally already have an accessible environment and curriculum for their student population; this may mean that there are limited subjects on offer.

Selective schools 

A selective school is a government school that enrols students based on some sort of selection criteria, usually academic. The term may have different connotations in different systems and is the opposite of an open or comprehensive school, which accepts all students, regardless of aptitude.

In New South Wales, student placement in fully and partially selective high schools is highly competitive, with approximately 3,600 places offered to the 15,000 students who sit the Selective High School Test.  there were 47 fully or partially selective government high schools, including 17 fully selective high schools (some of which are co-educational and others provide a single-sex educational environment); 25 partially selective high schools (high schools with both selective and comprehensive classes); four selective agricultural high schools; and one virtual selective high school. Of the 47 schools, 34 are located in greater metropolitan Sydney. Of the government selective high schools in New South Wales, James Ruse Agricultural High School is renowned for its academic achievements and competitiveness, as well as a near-perfect record of all students gaining university admission, especially in medicine, law and science. The school has outperformed every high school in New South Wales in the past 20 years in public university entrance examinations.

In Victoria, selective government high schools select all of their students based on an entrance examination. As of 2011, there were four selective schools: Melbourne High School, Mac.Robertson Girls' High School, Nossal High School and Suzanne Cory High School. In addition, there are three special schools namely Victorian College of the Arts Secondary School, John Monash Science School and Elizabeth Blackburn School of Sciences which cater to students opting for focused education in arts and science respectively.

In Queensland, there are four selective entry high schools. Brisbane State High School, established in 1921, is partially selective; and the three Queensland Academies which are fully selective and were formed during 2007 and 2008. All require entry based on academic entry tests, NAPLAN results, primary school grades, interviews and other considerations.

In Western Australia, selective secondary education (officially named Gifted and Talented Education (GATE)) is operated by the Western Australian Department of Education through the Gifted and Talented Selective Entrance Programs for Year 7, and subject to limited placement availability for year-levels upward to Year 11. All applicants are required to sit the Academic Selective Entrance Test and possibly complete combined interviews, auditions and/or workshops depending on the program(s) applied for. The programs are categorised into three strands: academic, language, and arts. Eighteen government schools participate in the Gifted and Talented Programs, each specialising in one of the strands. All participating schools are partially selective and partially local intake, except for Perth Modern School which is fully selective.

Specialist schools 

Schools that operate specialist education programs exist in all Australian states and territories. These schools are typically associated with the arts or elite sports programs. In South Australia, specialist schools cover the arts, gifted and talented programs, languages, agricultural schools, science, technology, engineering and mathematics, advanced technology project schools, sports schools, and trade training centres. In Victoria, examples of specialist government schools include those focused on science and maths (John Monash Science School), performing arts (Victorian College of the Arts Secondary School), sports (Maribyrnong Secondary College), and leadership and enterprise (The Alpine School). An alternative model is those sporting organisations that deliver specialist programs to a narrow selection of schools, such as Cricket Australia's Specialist School Program to three Western Australian schools.

International schools 

In Australia, international schools promote international education and may be operated by the government of the country of origin, the government of the state or territory in which the school is located, or be operated as an independent school. International schools include those schools that have received international accreditation such as from the Council of International Schools, the International Baccalaureate Organization, or the Western Association of Schools and Colleges, or other similar organisations. , approximately 80 Australian schools meet that definition, with the vast majority being schools that offered one or more of the International Baccalaureate programmes. Other schools are affiliated with specific cultures or languages, most notably French (e.g. Telopea Park School (ACT), Lycée Condorcet (NSW), Auburn High School (VIC)), German (e.g. German International School Sydney (NSW) and Deutsche Schule Melbourne (VIC)), or Japanese (e.g. Sydney Japanese International School (NSW), The Japanese School of Melbourne (VIC) and The Japanese School in Perth (WA)) schools, including Japanese supplementary weekend schools; or may generally be international in their outlook, including the International Grammar School (NSW) or the International School of Western Australia (WA).

Mixed-sex and single-sex education 
In Australia, both government and non-government schools operate co-educational and single-sex educational environments for students. The overwhelming number of schools are co-educational, with a small proportion of government schools operating single-sex schools, sometimes with a separate boys' and girls' school in the same suburb. All government single-sex schools are secondary schools. Examples of adjacent single-sex government secondary schools include Asquith Boys' and Asquith Girls', Canterbury Boys' and Canterbury Girls', North Sydney Boys' and North Sydney Girls', Randwick Boys' and Randwick Girls', and Sydney Boys' and Sydney Girls' (all in Sydney);  and Melbourne High and Mac.Robertson Girls' (in Melbourne).

The majority of single-sex schools in Australia are non-government schools, heavily weighted towards independent schools, some of which are Catholic independent schools. Some Catholic systemic schools are also single-sex schools; however, like government schools, the overwhelming majority are co-educational schools.

Day and boarding schools 

In Australia, both government and non-government schools operate day and boarding schools. , of the 10,584 registered schools operating in Australia, approximately 250 schools (or less than 2.5 per cent) were boarding schools. Boarding schools can provide a valuable platform for students to achieve their potential academically along with providing support and guidance with their psychological, social, emotional and spiritual development. Some Australian schools offer gender-specific (boys' [approximately 21 per cent] or girls' [approximately 28 per cent]) and co-educational boarding schools (51 per cent); with multi-modal options, such as full-time boarding and part-time boarding (for example, going home on the weekends) offered by some schools. Some specialist education schools, such as The Australian Ballet School, offer boarding facilities. The largest peak body for boarding schools in Australia, the Australian Boarding Schools Association, claimed that, in 2017, there were 22,815 students in boarding schools covered by the association, an increase from 19,870 in 2014.

Qualifications 
Within the context of the Australian Qualifications Framework, each state and territory is responsible for issuing certificates and/or qualifications to secondary students, collectively referred to as the Senior Secondary Certificate of Education. The following table serves as a summary of the qualifications issued by each state or territory:

As an alternative form (or as an addition to) the government-endorsed certification path, students, by approval, may elect to receive certification under the International Baccalaureate Diploma Programme.

Basic skills tests 

The National Assessment Program – Literacy and Numeracy (abbreviated as NAPLAN) is a series of tests focused on basic skills that are administered annually to Australian students. These standardised tests assess students' reading, writing, language (spelling, grammar and punctuation) and numeracy. Introduced in 2008, NAPLAN is administered by the Australian Curriculum, Assessment and Reporting Authority (ACARA) and is overseen by the Council of Australian Governments (COAG) Education Council. The tests are designed to determine if Australian students are achieving outcomes. The tests are designed to be carried out on the same days across Australia in any given year. Parents can decide whether their children take the test or not. The vast majority of Year 3, 5, 7 and 9 students participate. Although for year three students, they have to pass with a 70% mark to progress to Year 4. One of the aims of NAPLAN is to prepare young children for competitive examinations.

Provider of school education to international students 

In Australia, a student is considered as an international student if he/she studies at an approved educational institution and he/she is not an Australian citizen, Australian permanent resident, New Zealand citizen, or a holder of an Australian permanent resident humanitarian visa. The government maintains the Commonwealth Register of Institutions and Courses for Overseas Students (CRICOS) and, as of 2018, there were 396 school providers with an overall approved capacity of 88,285 students. While Australia as an education destination showed strong and sustained growth over many years, as of June 2019, school-based education fell by three per cent for the year, and represented approximately three per cent of all international student enrolments; with tertiary education, vocational education and training, and English Language Intensive Courses for Overseas Students (ELICOS) comprised 93 per cent of all enrolments and recorded 21 per cent annual growth.

Issues in Australian school education

Government education policy
Despite a substantial increase in government spending per student over ten years (after correcting for inflation), the proportion of students who are proficient in maths, reading and science has actually declined over that same period. The Organisation for Economic Co-operation and Development and the Menzies Research Centre have both concluded that increasing school funding above a basic level has little effect on student proficiency. Instead, they both recommend greater autonomy. That is, the states should merely monitor the performance of the schools. Individual principals should have full authority and responsibility for ensuring student proficiency in core areas.

In 2010 the Gillard Government commissioned David Gonski to the chair a committee to review funding of Australian schools. Entitled the Gonski Report, through the Council of Australian Governments the Gillard Government sought to implement the National Education Reform Agreement that would deliver an 9.4 billion school funding plan. Despite some states and territories becoming parties to the Agreement, the plan was shelved following the 2013 federal election. The Turnbull Government commissioned Gonski in 2017 to chair the independent Review to Achieve Educational Excellence in Australian Schools, commonly called Gonski 2.0. The government published the report on 30 April 2018. Following negotiation, bilateral agreements between the Commonwealth of Australia with each state and territory commenced on 1 January 2019, with the exception of Victoria, whose bilateral agreement commenced on 1 February 2019. The funding agreements provide states with funding for government schools (20 percent) and non-government schools (80 percent) taking into consideration annual changes in enrolment numbers, indexation and student or school characteristics. A National School Resourcing Board was charged with the responsibility of independently reviewing each state's compliance with the funding agreement(s).

Indigenous primary and secondary education 
Aboriginal and Torres Strait Islander children are at a significant disadvantage when compared to non-Indigenous Australians across a number of key school educational measures.  In 2008, the Council of Australian Governments announced seven "closing the gap" targets, of which four related to education, namely:
 participation in early childhood education: with the goal of 95 per cent of all Indigenous four-year-olds enrolled in early childhood education by 2025;
 reading, writing and numeracy levels: with the goal to halve the gap for Indigenous students in reading, writing and numeracy within a decade (by 2018);
 Year 12 attainment: with the goal to halve the gap for Indigenous 20–24 year olds in year 12 or equivalent attainment rates (by 2020); and
 school attendance: with the aim to close the gap between Indigenous and non-Indigenous school attendance within five years (by 2018).
, the target results were:

Bilingual education in schools

Bilingual education in Australia may be divided into three different types, or target audiences, each having somewhat different purposes: Aboriginal and Torres Strait Islander peoples; immigrant groups; and English speakers looking to add another language to their education. The first two are interested in language maintenance and language revitalisation for ensuing generations.

The first recorded government support for bilingual education came under the Menzies government in 1950, when the first government schools for Aboriginal students were opened at four sites in the Northern Territory, where instruction "should include English Language, Native Language (where appropriate)". Policies and practices varied in the following years, with the first five pilot programs introduced in 1973 after the Whitlam government came to power and brought in new federal policies. Yirrkala Community School was identified as the first to undergo bilingual accreditation in 1980, and bilingual students outperformed the non-bilingual students.

In the 21st century, there have been various approaches, including "Two-Way" and other programs that included language maintenance and language revitalisation in remote schools across the NT. However in October 2008, despite the NT Indigenous Education Strategic Plan 2006-2009 supporting bilingual instruction, it was mandated by the NT Government that English should be the language of instruction in all NT schools for the first four hours of the school day. After legal challenges, an AIATSIS Symposium on Bilingual Education in 2009, media coverage and much debate, the policy was replaced by a new policy: Literacy for Both Worlds, but that was soon withdrawn again. There was intervention by the Human Rights Commission, and in 2012 the House of Representatives Standing Committee on Aboriginal and Torres Strait Islander affairs issued a report which included the recommendation that: "Indigenous language education should be introduced to all schools with Aboriginal students, and indigenous languages included as an official Closing the Gap measure".

Prominent schools involved in bilingual education programs include Yirrkala Community Education Centre (CEC) and Shepherdson College on Galiwin'ku.

Religious education in government schools 

Constitutionally, Australia is a secular country. Section 116 of Chapter V. The States in the Australian Constitution reads: The Commonwealth shall not make any law for establishing any religion, or for imposing any religious observance, or for prohibiting the free exercise of any religion, and no religious test shall be required as a qualification for any office or public trust under the Commonwealth.

Nevertheless, Australia maintains one of the highest concentrations of religious schools, when compared with other OECD countries. Historically, the teaching of religion in Australian government schools has been a contentious issue and was a motivator for the foundation of the government schooling system.

While the National School Chaplaincy Programme provides an overarching framework based on pastoral care, not religious instruction, the practices and policies of religious instruction in Australian schools vary significantly from state to state. In New South Wales, the Special Religious Education classes are held in the government school sector that enable students to learn about the beliefs, practices, values and morals of a chosen religion. In Queensland, religious organisations may apply to school principals and, if approved, deliver approved religious instruction programs in government schools. In Victoria, legislation prescribes that government schools must not promote any particular religious practice, denomination or sect, and must be open to adherents of any philosophy, religion or faith. However, individual school principals may permit approved organisations to deliver non-compulsory special religious instruction classes of no more than 30 minutes per week per student, during lunchtime or in the hour before or after usual school hours. In Western Australia, both special religious education (not part of the general curriculum) and general religious education (as part of the general curriculum) are offered in government schools.

School violence
In July 2009, the Queensland Minister for Education said that the rising levels of violence in schools in the state were "totally unacceptable" and that not enough had been done to combat violent behaviour. In Queensland, 55,000 school students were suspended in 2008, nearly a third of which were for "physical misconduct".

In South Australia, 175 violent attacks against students or staff were recorded in 2008. Students were responsible for deliberately causing 3,000 injuries reported by teachers over two years from 2008 to 2009.

ESOS Act
The Education Services for Overseas Students Act 2000 (or ESOS Act) sets out the legal framework governing delivery of education to international students visiting Australia on a student visa.

Tertiary education 

Tertiary education (or higher education) in Australia is primarily study at university or a Registered Training Organisation studying Diploma or above in order to receive a qualification or further skills and training. A higher education provider is a body that is established or recognised by or under the law of the Australian Government, a State, the Australian Capital Territory or the Northern Territory. VET providers, both public and private are registered by state and territory governments.

There are 42 universities in Australia: 37 public universities, 3 private universities and 2 international private universities. , the largest university in Australia was Monash University in Melbourne: with five campuses and 75,000 students.

There are non-self-accrediting higher education providers accredited by state and territory authorities, numbering more than 132 as listed on state and territory registers. These include several that are registered in more than one state and territory.

All students doing nationally recognised training need to have a Unique Student Identifier (USI).

International tertiary students 
Australia has the highest ratio of international students per head of population in the world by a large margin, with 812,000 international students enrolled in the nation's universities and vocational institutions in 2019. Accordingly, in 2019, international students represented on average 26.7% of the student bodies of Australian universities. International education, therefore, represents one of the country's largest exports and has a pronounced influence on the country's demographics, with a significant proportion of international students remaining in Australia after graduation on various skill and employment visas. The Australian onshore international education sector is predicted to rise to 940,000 by 2025. The biggest source markets for onshore international learner enrolments in 2025 are expected to be China, India, Vietnam, Thailand, Nepal, Malaysia, Brazil and South Korea. According to a 2016 report by Deloitte Access Economics for the Australian Trade and Investment Commission, higher education and Vocational Education and Training (VET) were projected to be the fastest-growing sectors in onshore international education by 2025. Australian Government is also planning to add another 1.46 billion AUD according to Modern Manufacturing Strategy, which predicts a high jump in job growth and migration of people.

Rankings 
36 Australian tertiary educational institutions were listed in the QS World University Rankings for 2021; and 37 institutions were listed in the Times Higher Education World University Rankings in the same year. As of 2020, 34 Australian universities were listed in China's Academic Ranking of World Universities ranking, with The University of Melbourne achieving the highest global ranking, at 35th. In the same year, according to the U.S. News & World Report Best Global Universities Rankings, 38 Australian universities were ranked, ranging from the University of Melbourne, at 25th place, to Bond University, at 1133th place.

The Programme for International Student Assessment (PISA) evaluation in 2006 ranked the Australian education system as sixth for reading, eighth for science and thirteenth for mathematics, on a worldwide scale including 56 countries. The PISA evaluation in 2009 ranked the Australian education system as sixth for reading, seventh for science and ninth for mathematics, an improvement relative to the 2006 rankings. In 2012, education firm Pearson ranked Australian education as thirteenth in the world.

The Education Index, published with the UN's Human Development Index in 2018, based on data from 2017, listed Australia as 0.929, the second-highest in the world.

See also

 Australian Flexible Learning Framework
 Education in the Australian Capital Territory
 Education in New South Wales
 Education in South Australia
 Education in Tasmania
 Education in Victoria
 Education in Western Australia
 Gwyneth Dow
 History of state education in Queensland
 Homeschooling and distance education in Australia
 Reconciliation education
 Safe Schools Coalition Australia
 Tertiary education in Australia
 Tertiary education fees in Australia

Notes 
 These include: Department of Education, Employment and Training (DEET) (1988), Department of Employment, Education, Training and Youth Affairs (DEETYA) (1996), Department of Education, Training and Youth Affairs (DETYA) (1997), Department of Education, Science and Training (DEST) (2001), Department of Education, Employment and Workplace Relations (DEEWR) (2007), Department of Education (Australia, 2019–2020) (2013), Department of Education and Training (Australia) (2014).
: In Western Australia, the term district high school refers to schools that enrol students from Year K to Year 10.
: The schools listed here are Catholic schools that are independent and administered by a religious institute. It does not include Catholic schools that are systemically administered by a diocese, Catholic Education Office, or Catholic Education Commission.
: The South Australian Certificate of Education is also taught in Northern Territory secondary schools, where it is known as the Northern Territory Certificate of Education and Training.
: Initially six targets were set; with the school attendance target set at a subsequent COAG meeting.
: The initial target of 95% was set in 2008 with the aim to be achieved by 2013. The target was not achieved and was renewed in December 2015 with the aim to be achieved by 2025.
: The 2018 NAPLAN data were unavailable at the time of publication of the 2017-18 National Indigenous Reform Agreement Performance data report.

References

Further reading
 
 
 Passow, A. Harry et al. The National Case Study: An Empirical Comparative Study of Twenty-One Educational Systems.  (1976) online

External links
 
 
 Australia: Education GPS published by the OECD
 
 

 
Public policy in Australia
Higher education in Australia